Anselm Lincoln House is a historic home located at Malone in Franklin County, New York. It was built in 1830 and has a 2-story rectangular main block, three bays long by two bays wide, and -story wing.  It is built of beautifully cut and fitted ashlar block, two feet thick.  It is believed to be the oldest stone house in Franklin County.  It was donated to the North Country Community College in 1974.

It was listed on the National Register of Historic Places in 1975.

References

External links

Houses on the National Register of Historic Places in New York (state)
Houses completed in 1830
Houses in Franklin County, New York
1830 establishments in New York (state)
National Register of Historic Places in Franklin County, New York